The Brent field was an oil and gas field located in the East Shetland Basin of the North Sea,  north-east of Lerwick in the Shetland Islands, Scotland, at the water depth of . The field operated by Shell UK Limited was discovered in 1971 and was once one of the most productive parts of the UK's offshore assets but has reached the stage where production is no longer economically viable. Decommissioning of the Brent field is complete with the exception of Brent C, which is producing from another field.
The discovery well 211/26-1 was drilled in 1971 by the semi-submersible drilling rig "Staflo". This was a major surprise at the time as the nearest land in Scotland and Norway is composed of granite and other non reservoir metamorphic rocks.

Name
Shell initially named all of its UK oil fields after seabirds in alphabetical order by discovery – Auk, Brent, Cormorant, Dunlin, Eider, Fulmar and so on. Brent refers to the brent goose, and in turn gave its initials to the geologic subdivisions of the Middle Jurassic-age Brent Group that make up the field: Broom, Rannoch, Etive, Ness and Tarbert formations, with each name representing a loch in the Scottish Highlands.

Geology

Situated in the East Shetland Basin, the Brent is the archetype for many of the fields in the area, consisting of a tilted fault block exposing the eponymous Brent formation, next to bounding faults which allowed migration from deeper adjacent "kitchen" areas where the Kimmeridge Clay Formation becomes fully mature and releases hydrocarbons. Unusually on a worldwide scale (but common in this basin), the seal or cap rock for the reservoir (which stops the hydrocarbons from migrating further towards the surface) is also the Kimmeridge Clay, or technically the Heather Formation immediately below.

Production

Production started on 11 November 1976, and on 13 December 1976 the first tanker was loaded. The Brent field oil was extracted by four platforms in an irregular SSW-NNE line. The first in place was the concrete-legged "Condeep" Brent Bravo, built by Norwegian Contractors in Stavanger, in August 1975. This was followed by the steel-jacket Brent Alpha built by Redpath Dorman Long in Methil and installed in May 1976; the concrete-legged Brent Delta, again built by Norwegian Contractors in Stavanger, in July 1976; and the concrete-base Brent Charlie, built by McAlpine/Sea Tank in Ardyne Point, installed in June 1978. As of 2004, the field was still producing oil through a manifold (all Brent Alpha fluids are produced across to Brent Bravo). A fifth installation, the floating Brent Spar, served as a storage- and tanker-loading buoy and was installed early in the field's construction. The "spar" design of this installation led to the name by which it became the best known of the Brent installations (outside the oil industry). The field also included a remote flare, the "Brent Flare", which was used to flare off excess gas before gas handling and export facilities were installed in the field, also used as a vent in winter 1995–96. This unit was decommissioned and removed using a heavy lifting barge in 2005.

The topsides for Brent Charlie were designed by Matthew Hall Engineering which was awarded the contract in January 1974. Initially there were facilities for 19 oil production wells, nine water injection wells, six gas injection wells and three spare slots. There were three production trains each with four stages of separation with the first stage separators operating at a pressure of 9.6 bar. Electricity generation was powered by three 12 MW Rolls-Royce Avon gas turbines. The topside accommodation was for 120 people. There were 14 topsides modules and the topsides weight was 34,000 tonnes.

The initial design parameters of the Brent installations is summarised in the table.

The field supplied oil via the Brent System pipeline to the terminal at Sullom Voe, while gas was piped through the FLAGS pipeline ashore at St Fergus on the north-east coast of Scotland. The production of oil from the field (in 1000s barrels) was:The field underwent a £1.3 billion upgrade project in the mid-1990s, which involved depressurising the entire reservoir and making extensive modifications to three of the four Brent platforms. This converted them to low-pressure operation, which unlocked significant quantities of natural gas from the reservoir and extended the field life beyond 2010.

The field's peak production capacity reached 504,000 barrels of oil per day (bopd) in 1982 and it produced a total of approximately three billion barrels of oil equivalent as of 2008.

The Brent field decommissioning project was initiated in 2006. Brent Delta was the first platform to cease production in December 2011, while the Brent Alpha and Bravo platforms stopped production in November 2014, Brent Charlie in March 2021.

Decommission

The Brent pipelines decommissioning programme was approved by the UK government in March 2020. As per the decommissioning plan, the gravity-based structures (GBS) of Delta, Charlie, and Bravo platforms, the jacket footings of Alpha platform, drill cuttings, and the GBS cell contents will not be removed from the field. The GBS subsea storage cells were used to temporarily store crude oil before pumping to tankers or pipeline.

The Brent field is being decommissioned in a phased manner. The Brent Delta topside decommissioning programme was approved by the UK government in July 2015, while that for the Alpha, Bravo, and the Charlie platforms were approved in August 2018. The topsides of the Brent Delta platform, weighing approximately 24,200 t, was removed in a single-lift in April 2017 and transported to Hartlepool for recycling. The topside was completely dismantled by February 2019.

The topsides of the Brent Bravo platform, weighing approximately 25,000 t, was removed in a single-lift in June 2019. The topside is currently being dismantled and recycled.

The legs of the Brent Bravo and Delta platforms remain in place with their GBS subsea storage cells. This will also apply to the Brent Charlie platform when decommissioned. The contents of the GBS storage cells are likely to be residual hydrocarbons and radioactive toxic elements.

Air incidents involving workers
On 31 July 1979, Dan Air fixed wing aircraft crashed attempting to take off from Sumburgh Airport. The flight was returning Brent Field workers to Aberdeen. There were 17 fatalities. The aircraft was an ex Aerolineas Argentinas HS 748 manufactured in 1962. The main cause was found to be a faulty gust lock. The co-pilot was found to have tranquillisers in his system. It is not known if he was in control as he had less than 100 hours on this type of aircraft.

On 6 November 1986, a Boeing Vertol BV234 Chinook helicopter G-BWFC crashed on approach to Sumburgh airport. The flight was returning from the Brent Field. There were 45 fatalities and 2 survivors one of whom was the pilot. The cause was found to be faulty transmission, which caused the twin rotor blades to collide.

On 25 July 1990, a Sikorsky S61-N helicopter G-BEWL crashed while attempting to land on Brent Spar. There were 6 fatalities including both pilots. The cause was found to be pilot error and design of the helideck.

See also 
Brent crude
Energy policy of the United Kingdom
Energy use and conservation in the United Kingdom

References

North Sea oil fields
Oil and gas industry in Shetland
Oil fields of Scotland
Shell plc oil and gas fields